The 1901 Michigan State Normal Normalites football team was an American football team that represented Michigan State Normal College (later renamed Eastern Michigan University) as a member of the Michigan Intercollegiate Athletic Association during the 1901 college football season.  In its season under head coach Clayton Teetzel, the team compiled a record of 3–5 and was outscored by a total of 167 to 58. Phillip E. Dennis was the team captain.

Schedule

References

Michigan State Normal
Eastern Michigan Eagles football seasons
Michigan State Normal Normalites football